The 1980 United States presidential election in Mississippi took place on November 4, 1980. All fifty states and The District of Columbia were part of the 1980 United States presidential election. Mississippi voters chose seven electors to the Electoral College, who voted for president and vice president.

Mississippi was won by former California Governor Ronald Reagan (R) by a slim margin of 1.33%. However, in future elections, the state would become a Republican stronghold, and no Democratic presidential candidate has carried the state since Jimmy Carter in 1976. , this is the last election in which Winston County, Tippah County, Itawamba County, Union County, Prentiss County, Pontotoc County, Lee County, Lafayette County, Attala County, Monroe County, Madison County, Calhoun County, Tate County, Marion County, Leake County, Grenada County, and Franklin County voted for the Democratic candidate, as well as the last time that Clarke County was not carried by the Republican candidate; as Reagan and Carter ended up in a tie in Clarke County.

At the time it was the election with the largest amount of votes in Mississippi history.

Results

Results by county

Notes

References

Mississippi
1980
1980 Mississippi elections